ASMP may refer to:
 Air-Sol Moyenne Portée (French for medium-range air to surface), an air-launched nuclear weapon delivery system
 American Society of Media Photographers or before 1992 American Society of Magazine Photographers
 Asymmetric multiprocessing, a computing term